Marlton is one of the original neighbourhoods in the area of Charleswood in Winnipeg, Manitoba.

Neighbourhoods in Winnipeg

Charleswood, Winnipeg